Billy Harper (born January 17, 1943) is an American jazz saxophonist, "one of a generation of Coltrane-influenced tenor saxophonists" with a distinctively stern, hard-as-nails sound on his instrument.

Biography
He was born in Houston, Texas, United States. In 1965, Harper earned a Bachelor of Music degree from the University of North Texas.

Harper has played with some of jazz's greatest drummers; he served with Art Blakey's Messengers for two years (1968–1970); he played very briefly with Elvin Jones (1970), he played with the Thad Jones/ Mel Lewis Orchestra in the 1970s, and was a member of Max Roach's quartet from 1971–1978. In 1979, Harper formed his own group, touring with it and documenting its music on the recording Billy Harper Quintet in Europe, and he was featured as a soloist on a 1983 recording, Such Great Friends, with virtuoso, visionary pianist and record producer Stanley Cowell.  After a period of relative inactivity in the 1980s, Harper came back strong with another international tour, which ended with perhaps his most ambitious recording: the three-volume Live on Tour in the Far East (1991).  In the new millennium, Harper's recording activity has been subdued and sporadic, though more recently he appeared as a regular member of pianist-jazz historian Randy Weston's ensembles.  In 2013, they recorded their first album as a duo, entitled The Roots of the Blues.

A retrospective of Billy Harper's career would include the following among its highlights: The saxophonist performed on Gil Evans' 1973 album Svengali, and contributed two of the most-performed tunes in the band's repertoire: "Priestess" and "Thoroughbred". Harper's own 1973 album Capra Black "remains one of the seminal recordings of jazz's black consciousness movement – a profoundly spiritual effort that channels both the intellectual complexity of the avant garde as well as the emotional potency of gospel". The Italian jazz label Black Saint was launched with Harper's 1975 album, Black Saint. His later releases have mostly been on SteepleChase and Evidence Records.

Long associated almost exclusively with the inner circle of the New York City jazz scene — except for breaks while touring with his ensembles to Europe and the far East — Harper, in mid-2017, suddenly attained a degree of international prominence, because of his short but key role in the acclaimed jazz film, I Called Him Morgan. Released for home streaming and purchase in June 2017, the film documents the music and life of trumpet prodigy Lee Morgan and the woman who saves and restores him after he hit rock bottom due to heroin addiction. It is a movie that makes the viewer a partner with its Swedish director, in his seven-year search for the evidence that might help explain how the same woman who was Morgan's savior, would become his killer at the instant he was retaking the bandstand for the last set at Slug's Saloon, a jazz club on the Bowery in lower East Manhattan. Walking right alongside Lee Morgan at this moment — the someone who hears a "bang" that for the next several extended seconds leaves both men — the actual victim and the bandmate — equally stunned and confused — was Billy Harper.

Discography

As leader/co-leader 
1973: Capra Black (Strata-East)
1974: Jon & Billy (Trio) – with Jon Faddis
1975: Black Saint (Billy Harper Quintet On Tour In Europe '75) (Black Saint)
1977: Love on the Sudan (Denon)
1977: Soran-Bushi, B.H. (Denon)
1978: Knowledge of Self (Denon)
1979: Billy Harper Quintet in Europe (Soul Note)
1979: The Awakening (Marge)
1979: Trying to Make Heaven My Home (Saba/MPS)
1980: The Believer (Baystate/RVC)
1980: Billy Harper Quintet [live] (PolJazz)
1989: Destiny Is Yours (Steeplechase)
1991: Live on Tour in the Far East (Steeplechase)
1991: Live on Tour in the Far East Vol. 2 (Steeplechase)
1991: Live on Tour in the Far East Vol. 3 (Steeplechase)
1993: Somalia (Evidence)
1997: If Our Hearts Could Only See (DIW)
1999: Soul of an Angel (Metropolitan)
2008: Blueprints of Jazz Vol. 2 (Talking House Records)
2013: The Roots of the Blues (Sunnyside) – with Randy Weston

With The Cookers
 Warriors (Jazz Legacy Productions, 2010)
 Cast The First Stone (Plus Loin Music/Harmonia Mundi, 2011)
 Believe (Motéma Music, 2012)
 Time And Time Again (Motéma Music, 2014)
 The Call Of The Wild And Peaceful Heart (Smoke Sessions, 2016)
 Look Out! (Gearbox, 2021)

As sideman
With Louis Armstrong
Louis Armstrong and His Friends (Flying Dutchman/Amsterdam, 1970)

With Horacee Arnold
 Tribe (Columbia, 1973)

With Art Blakey
 Live! Vol. 1 (Everest, 1968)
 Moanin (LRC, 1968)With Joe BonnerAngel Eyes (Muse, 1976)With Stanley Cowell Such Great Friends (Strata-East, 1983)With Charles Earland Intensity (Prestige, 1972)
 Charles III (Prestige, 1972–1973)With Gil Evans Blues in Orbit (Enja, 1969–1971)
 Where Flamingos Fly (Artists House, 1971)
 Svengali (Atlantic, 1973)
 The Gil Evans Orchestra Plays the Music of Jimi Hendrix (RCA, 1974)
 There Comes a Time (RCA, 1975)With Sonny Fortune Great Friends (Black & Blue, 1986)With Bobbi Humphrey Flute In (Blue Note, 1971)With The Thad Jones/Mel Lewis Orchestra Consummation (Blue Note, 1970)
 Potpourri (Philadelphia International, 1974)
 Suite for Pops (Horizon/A&M, 1975)With Mark Masters Jazz Orchestra Priestess (Capri, 1990) – with Jimmy KnepperWith Grachan Moncur III Exploration (Capri, 2004)With Lee Morgan The Last Session (Blue Note, 1971)
 We Remember You (Fresh Sound, 1972)With Max Roach Lift Every Voice and Sing (Atlantic, 1971)
 Live in Tokyo Vol. 1 (Denon, 1977)
 Live in Tokyo Vol. 2 (Denon, 1977)
 The Loadstar (Horo, 1977)
 Live in Amsterdam (Baystate/RVC, 1977)
 Confirmation (Fluid, 1978)With Woody Shaw Love Dance (Muse, 1975)With Leon ThomasThe Leon Thomas Album (Flying Dutchman, 1970)With Malachi Thompson47th Street (Delmark, 1997)
 Freebop Now! (Delmark, 1998)
 Blue Jazz (Delmark, 2003) – with Gary BartzWith Charles Tolliver With Love (Mosaic/Blue Note, 2006)
 Emperor March: Live at the Blue Note (Half Note, 2008)With McCoy Tyner Journey (Birdology, 1993)With Randy Weston Tanjah (Polydor, 1973)
 Carnival (Freedom, 1974)
 The Spirits of Our Ancestors (Antilles/Verve, 1991)
 Saga (Verve, 1995)
 The Roots of the Blues (Sunnyside, 2013)With Piotr Wojtasik'''
 Quest'' (Power Bros Records – PB 00147, 1996)

References 

American jazz educators
American jazz flautists
Soul-jazz saxophonists
Hard bop saxophonists
Rutgers University faculty
University of North Texas College of Music alumni
Musicians from Houston
Strata-East Records artists
1943 births
Living people
21st-century saxophonists
Jazz musicians from Texas
The Thad Jones/Mel Lewis Orchestra members
21st-century flautists